Me 'n Rock 'n Roll Are Here to Stay is a 1974 album by ex-The Temptations singer David Ruffin. On this album the singer was given another opportunity to prove himself, as the former Temptations frontman was teamed with Norman Whitfield - an "A-list" producer who recorded a number of classics with the Temptations.

Track listing 

Side One
 "I Saw You When You Met Her" (Norman Whitfield)
 "Take Me Clear From Here" (Vincent DiMirco)
 "Smiling Faces Sometimes" (Whitfield, Barrett Strong)
 "Me 'n Rock 'n Roll Are Here to Stay" (Whitfield)

Side Two
 "Superstar (Remember How You Got Where You Are)" (Whitfield, Strong)
 "No Matter Where" (Clarence Drayton, Tamy Smith)
 "City Stars" (Charles Higgins, Jr, Dobie Gray)
 "I Just Want to Celebrate" (Dino Fekaris, Nick Zesses)

Personnel 
 David Ruffin - vocals
 Dennis Coffey, Eddie Willis, Johnny McGhee, Melvin Ragin - guitar
 Henry Davis, Ron Brown - bass
 Earl Van Dyke, Mark Davis - keyboards
 Aaron Smith, Ed Greene, James Gadson - drums
 Eddie "Bongo" Brown, Stephanie Spruill - percussion
 Mykal Moore - saxophone
 Freddy Dunn, Kenny Copeland - trumpet
 Carolyn Willis, Jessie Kirkland, Joe Greene, Julia Waters, Lisa Roberts, Luther Waters, Maxine Waters, Oren Waters - background vocals

Chart history

Singles

References 

1974 albums
Albums produced by Norman Whitfield
Motown albums
David Ruffin albums